Robert O'Flynn (born 7 November 1997) is an Irish hurler who plays as a right corner-forward for club side Erin's Own and at inter-county level with the Cork senior hurling team.

Playing career

Christian Brothers College

O'Flynn first came to prominence as a hurler with Christian Brothers College. Having played hurling in every grade during his time at the school, he usually lined out in the forwards on the senior team in the Harty Cup.

University College Cork

On 23 February 2019, O'Flynn was a substitute for University College Cork when they faced Mary Immaculate College in the Fitzgibbon Cup final. He was introduced in the 15th minute and claimed a winners' medal after the 2-21 to 0-13 victory.

O'Flynn played in a second successive Fitzgibbon Cup final on 12 February 2020. Lining out at right wing-forward, he ended the game with a second successive winners' medal after the 0-18 to 2-11 defeat of the Institute of Technology, Carlow.

Erin's Own

O'Flynn joined the Erin's Own club at a young age and played in all grades at juvenile and underage levels. In 2016 he won a county under-21 championship medal following a 3-24 to 1-16 defeat of Ballincollig. By this stage, O'Flynn had already made his senior hurling championship debut, coming on as a substitute in a 2-22 to 0-16 defeat of Carrigtwohill on 23 May 2015. After a successful 2016 championship campaign, O'Flynn lined out in his first senior final on 9 October 2016, however, Erin's Own suffered a 0-19 to 2-10 defeat by Glen Rovers.

Cork

Minor and under-21

O'Flynn first played for Cork at minor level in 2015, however, his sole season in the grade ended without success with a defeat by Limerick. On 13 July 2017, O'Flynn made his first appearance for the Cork under-21 hurling team and scored a key goal in a one-point defeat of Waterford. On 4 July 2018, O'Flynn won a Munster medal after Cork's 2-23 to 1-13 defeat of Tipperary in the final. On 26 August 2018, he scored three points from play in Cork's 3-13 to 1-16 All-Ireland final defeat by Tipperary in what was his last game in the grade. O'Flynn was later nominated for the Team of the Year.

Senior

Following an impressive club championship campaign, O'Flynn was added to the Cork training panel in October 2016. He made his competitive debut on 15 January 2017 in a Munster League defeat of Limerick and later played against Clare in the National League. On 9 July 2017, O'Flynn won his first Munster medal as a non-playing substitute following a 1-25 to 1-20 defeat of Clare in the final.

O'Flynn missed most of the 2018 Munster Championship after suffering a concussion in Cork's opening round robin game against Clare. On 1 July 2018, he won a second successive Munster medal as a non-playing substitute following a 2-24 to 3-19 defeat of Clare in the final.

Career statistics

Club

Inter-county

Honours
University College Cork
Fitzgibbon Cup (2): 2019, 2020

Erin's Own
Cork Under-21 A Hurling Championship (1): 2016

Cork
Munster Senior Hurling Championship (2): 2017, 2018
Munster Under-21 Hurling Championship (1): 2018

References

External link
Robbie O'Flynn profile at the Cork GAA website

1997 births
Living people
Erin's Own (Cork) hurlers
UCC hurlers
Cork inter-county hurlers